This article features the 2001 CONCACAF U-20 Tournament qualifying stage. Caribbean and Central American teams entered in separate tournaments. The North American teams Mexico and the United States automatically qualified, as well as main tournament hosts Canada (North America) and Trinidad and Tobago (Caribbean). Fifteen Caribbean teams entered, of which one qualified and seven Central American teams entered, of which three qualified.

Caribbean

Preliminary round
Surinam received a bye because Guyana withdrew.

|}

Group stage

Group A
All matches were played in Haiti.

Group B
Bermuda and the US Virgin Islands withdrew, so only two teams were left in this group.

|}

Group C
All matches were played in Jamaica.

Group D
All matches were played in Suriname. Saint Lucia withdrew.

Final round

Central America
All matches were played in Panama.

Group stage

Group A

Group B

Semifinals

Third-place match

Final

Qualified for Main Tournament
  (Caribbean winners)
  (Central American winners)
  (Central American runners-up)
  (Central American third place)

See also
 2001 CONCACAF U-20 Tournament

External links
Results by RSSSF

CONCACAF U-20 Championship qualification
2001 in youth association football